Beit (also spelled bait, Arabic: بيت  pronounced [beːt, bi(ː)t, bajt], literally "a house") is a metrical unit of Arabic, Iranian, Urdu and Sindhi poetry

Beit may also refer to:
Beit baronets, U.K.
Beit (surname)
Beit, a component of  Arabic placenames and Hebrew placenames literally meaning "house"
Masada: Beit album by American jazz band Masada